Erich Lindenlaub (21 December 1930 – 16 January 2019) was a German cross-country skier. He competed in the men's 30 kilometre event at the 1956 Winter Olympics.

References

External links
 

1930 births
2019 deaths
German male cross-country skiers
Olympic cross-country skiers of the United Team of Germany
Cross-country skiers at the 1956 Winter Olympics
Place of birth missing
20th-century German people